Anolis smallwoodi, the green-blotched giant anole or Smallwood's anole, is a species of lizard in the family Dactyloidae. The species is found in Cuba.

References

Anoles
Reptiles described in 1964
Endemic fauna of Cuba
Reptiles of Cuba
Taxa named by Albert Schwartz (zoologist)